Detroit Arsenal may refer to:

 Detroit Arsenal (Dearborn), a 19th-century arsenal in Dearborn, Michigan, United States
 Detroit Arsenal (soccer), a defunct American soccer team
 Detroit Arsenal Tank Plant, a 20th-century factory in Warren, Michigan, United States